Graand Production is a film production company which produces Malayalam language films, founded by Indian film actor Dileep and his brother Anoop. Its first production venture was the 2003 film C.I.D. Moosa.

Filmography

References

Companies based in Kochi
Indian companies established in 2003
Film production companies of Kerala
2003 establishments in Kerala
Mass media companies established in 2003